Gear Homestead, named Okowai ('muddy water') by its owner James Gear, is a historic building in Porirua, New Zealand.  It was listed by the New Zealand Historic Places Trust (since renamed to Heritage New Zealand) as a Category 2 historic place in 1983.

Gear Homestead is significant because of its association with James Gear, a butcher who founded the Gear Meat Preserving and Freezing Company.   The company was one of the largest employers in Wellington and also played a large part in the development of Petone.

The building was designed by Robert Edwards and built in 1887 by William Hartley. It was constructed of matai, totara and kauri, and the wall on the south side is about 30 cm thick and filled with sawdust for insulation against southerly winds. When James Gear's health declined and he was confined to a wheelchair, he had a cottage built behind the house, with a ramp connecting it to the main house. He lived in the cottage with a nurse and manservant, separate from his family. The house remained in the ownership of the Gear family until 1967, and in 1975 it was bought by Poriurua City Council.

In the early to mid 1980s, the historic building was used as a major location in Peter Jackson's  first film, Bad Taste. The building was home to the Iredale and Tiegan family in the 1995 children’s TV series Mirror, Mirror (TV series), and in 2007 it was used as a location in the horror movie When Night Falls.

The homestead is now a cafe/bar/restaurant and is open 7 days a week.

References 

Houses in New Zealand
1880s architecture in New Zealand
Heritage New Zealand Category 2 historic places in the Wellington Region
Buildings and structures in Porirua